The Canon AT-1 is a 35mm FD-mount single-lens reflex camera manufactured by Canon of Japan from December 1977. It was produced purely for export and was never sold in the home Japanese market. It is a version of the popular AE-1 but without the shutter-speed priority auto-exposure mode of that camera. The AT-1 features manual exposure only. This made the camera cheaper, as some consumers did not desire or require autoexposure and did not want to pay for it.

A light meter is included, featuring TTL center-weighted average metering with a CdS photocell, and a match needle in the viewfinder.

The accessories produced for the AE-1 also work with the AT-1, including motor drives.

External links 
 AT-1 at the Canon Camera Museum
 Photography in Malaysia (2000). Canon AT-1 Camera. Retrieved on October 23, 2005.

AT-1